Harihar Singh or Bihari Ji Singh (1925-1994) was an Indian politician and a former Chief Minister of Bihar. He succeeded Bhola Paswan Shashtri, as the Chief Minister of Bihar in 1969. Harihar Singh's tenure as Chief Minister lasted just a few months – he led an INC-led coalition government and all six members of Soshit Dal, a constituent party of the coalition, defected to the Opposition during a budget session of the Bihar Assembly.

Early life 
Harihar Singh was born in a small village of Chaugain in Buxar, Bihar in British India to an upper caste Rajput family.

Legacy 
He was also a Bhojpuri poet and has written many patriotic Bhojpuri poems full of nationalist ideas.

See also

List of Rajputs

References

Biographies 
 Anugrah Abhinandan Granth samiti. 1947  Anugrah Abhinandan Granth. Bihar.
 Anugrah Narayan centenary year celebration Committee. 1987.  Bihar Bibhuti: Vayakti Aur Kriti , Bihar.
 Bimal Prasad (editor). 1980. A Revolutionary's Quest: Selected Writings of Jayaprakash Narayan. Oxford University Press, Delhi.

External links
Members of Constituent Assembly from Bihar
First Bihar Government:The Anugrah Babu-Sri Babu Raj
Freedom Fighters of India

1925 births
1994 deaths
Chief Ministers of Bihar
Indian National Congress politicians
Indian Hindus
Bihar MLAs 1969–1972
Indian independence activists from Bihar
Chief ministers from Indian National Congress